The Régiment de Normandie was created in 1616 from different military groups in Normandy by the Maréchal of France Concini, marquis d'Ancre and the favorite of the Queen Marie de Médicis.

See also
 Military of New France

External links
 Soldiers of the Sun King

References

Military units and formations established in the 1610s
Military units and formations disestablished in 1791
Line infantry regiments of the Ancien Régime